The Elite League Pairs Championship was a motorcycle speedway contest between the top two riders from each club competing in the Elite League in the United Kingdom, staged from 2004 to 2011.

History
The Championship was a reincarnation of the British League Pairs Championship, which ran from 1976 until 1987. After the eighth running of the competition in 2011 the Championship was discontinued. However a one off Championship was held for the top tier once again in 2017 and was called the SGB Premiership Pairs Championship and won by the King's Lynn Stars riders Chris Holder & Robert Lambert.

Rules
In the Qualification Heats, riders are allocated starting gates. For the Semi-Finals, the group winners have first choice of gate positions (A&C or B&D). Gate A is on the inside of the track, whilst Gate D is on the outside. For the Final, the gate positions (A&C and B&D) are decided by the toss of a coin. A pair finishing third and second will score five points, whereas a pair finishing first and last will score only four. Race points scored over all Qualification Heats are used to determine the final group placings.

Winners

See also
 List of United Kingdom Speedway Pairs champions
 British League Pairs Championship

References

Speedway competitions in the United Kingdom